Clarivett Yllescas Abad (born August 11, 1993 in Chincha, Ica Region) is a Peruvian volleyball player who plays for the Peru team.

Career

2010: Rise to fame
Clarivett signed with Peruvian volleyball club Divino Maestro for the 2010–11 season.

Later that year she debuted as captain of Peru's U20 National Volleyball Team at the 2010 South America Volleyball Championship U20 winning the Silver Medal. Her team also won the Bronze Medal at the 2010 Youth Olympic Games.

2011–2012: Rebirth of Peruvian Volleyball
Clarivett helped her club, Divino Mestro, win the 2010–11 season of the Peruvian volleyball league

Clarivett played with her National Junior Team at the U-20 Pan-American Cup, held in her country, Peru. Her team won the Gold Medal 

She also participated with her team in the 2011 Women's Junior World Championship which has held in Peru, her team finished in 6th place.

Right after the Junior World Championship, Clarivett joined Peru's senior team for the 2011 World Grand Prix, she also represented her country at the 2011 South American Championship winning the bronze medal.

2013–present: Hiatus due to injury
Late 2012 Clarivett signed to play for Universidad César Vallejo Club for the 2012–13 season of the Peruvian Volleyball League, however, Clarivett suffered from a stress fracture of the left ankle which left her unable to play the season. In January 2013 it was revealed Clarivett would not be able to play for at least six months.

Clubs
  Divino Maestro (2010 – 2012)
  CV Universidad César Vallejo (2013 – 2016)
  Circolo Sportivo Italiano (2016 – 2018)
  Volley Club de Marcq-en-Baroeul Lille Métropole (2018 – 2020)

Awards

National Team

Senior Team
 2013 Bolivarian Games –  Gold Medal
 2013 South American Championship –  Bronze Medal
 2011 South American Championship –  Bronze Medal

Junior Team
 2010 Junior South American Championship –  Silver Medal
 2010 Youth Olympic Games –  Bronze Medal
 2011 Junior Pan-American Cup –  Gold Medal

Clubs
 2010–11 Liga Nacional Superior de Voleibol –  Champion with Divino Maestro

References

External links
 FIVB Profile

1993 births
Living people
Peruvian women's volleyball players
Volleyball players at the 2010 Summer Youth Olympics
Volleyball players at the 2015 Pan American Games
Pan American Games competitors for Peru
People from Ica Region
21st-century Peruvian women